This list of biochemistry awards is an index to articles on notable awards for contributions to biochemistry, the study of chemical processes within and relating to living organisms. The list gives the country of the organization that gives the award, but the award may not be limited to people from that country.

Awards

See also

 Lists of awards
 Lists of science and technology awards
 List of biology awards
 List of chemistry awards

References

 
biochemistry